Halina Daniec (25 January 1949 – 30 April 2015) was a Polish gymnast. She competed in six events at the 1968 Summer Olympics.

References

1949 births
2015 deaths
Polish female artistic gymnasts
Olympic gymnasts of Poland
Gymnasts at the 1968 Summer Olympics
People from Świdnica
Sportspeople from Lower Silesian Voivodeship